Jennifer Paige is the debut album by Jennifer Paige, released in 1998. It launched her only international chart topping single "Crush", which peaked in the US at #3 on the Billboard Hot 100. Two others singles Sober and Always You were released. The song "Somewhere, Someday" was covered by 'N Sync for 1998's Pokémon: The First Movie soundtrack. The album reached Gold Record status in Canada May 20, 1999.

Singles
"Crush" released on June 16, 1998 as the first single from her debut album. "Crush" was an international hit that peaked at number three on the US Billboard Hot 100, earned a Gold certification from the Recording Industry Association of America, and sold 700,000 by the end of 1998. It reached number one in three countries: Australia (two weeks), Canada (five weeks) and New Zealand (one week). In Australia, the song is certified 2× Platinum for more than 140,000 copies shipped, while in New Zealand it is certified Gold for sales of over 5,000. In Europe "Crush" reached number four in France and the United Kingdom, going Gold in both countries, and number six in Ireland, the Netherlands and Norway. It also became a top-ten hit in Austria, Walloon Belgium, Denmark, Hungary and Spain, and it reached the top 20 in Flanders, Germany, Iceland, Sweden and Switzerland.

"Sober" was released on February 19, 1999 as the second single released from her debut studio album. It failed to chart in the United States but managed to enter top 70 in the United Kingdom, Australia, and New Zealand.

Released on July 12, 1999 as third single, "Always You" reached number six on the Billboard Dance/Club Play chart.

Track listing

Charts

Certifications and sales

References

1998 debut albums
Jennifer Paige albums
Hollywood Records albums